Mark Ian "Tommo" Thomson (born 5 August 1963 in Swindon, Wiltshire) is a former English professional darts player who played in Professional Darts Corporation (PDC) events.

Career
From Swindon, Wiltshire. Thomson played in six stages on the UK Open, reaching the last 8, but lost to Tom Wilson of England in 2003 and Mark Walsh of England in 2005.

He played in the 2005 PDC World Darts Championship debut year, but lost in the last 32 to Andy Hamilton of England.  He was Runner Up in the 2005 Vauxhall Spring Pro, losing to Colin Lloyd of England.

He won the 2009 Malta Open, defeating Roy Brown of England.

He played in the 2010 Winmau World Masters, losing to Ronald L. Briones of the Philippines in the last 64.

He won the 2005 National Championship in Stoke-on-Trent. He won the 2005 Hampshire Open beating Lionel Sams 5 - 4 in the final. Along with Lionel Sams winning the Dutch pairs in 2005

Personal life
Thomson is married to Allison from Swindon, Wiltshire.

Mark lives in Finchley, London of October 2021.

World Championship performances

PDC
 2005: Last 32: (lost to Andy Hamilton 0–3) (sets)

References

External links
 

1963 births
Living people
English darts players
Professional Darts Corporation former pro tour players
British Darts Organisation players
Sportspeople from Swindon
People from Finchley